In fiction, a MacGuffin (sometimes McGuffin) is an object, device, or event that is necessary to the plot and the motivation of the characters, but insignificant, unimportant, or irrelevant in itself. The term was originated by Angus MacPhail for film, adopted by Alfred Hitchcock, and later extended to a similar device in other fiction.

The MacGuffin technique is common in films, especially thrillers. Usually, the MacGuffin is revealed in the first act, and thereafter declines in importance. It can reappear at the climax of the story but may actually be forgotten by the end of the story. Multiple MacGuffins are sometimes derisively identified as plot coupons.

History and use
The use of a MacGuffin as a plot device predates the name MacGuffin. The Holy Grail of Arthurian legend has been cited as an early example of a MacGuffin. The Holy Grail is the desired object that is essential to initiate and advance the plot, but the final disposition of the Grail is never revealed, suggesting that the object is not of significance in itself.

The World War I-era actress Pearl White used the term "weenie" to identify whatever object (a roll of film, a rare coin, expensive diamonds, etc.) impelled the heroes and villains to pursue each other through the convoluted plots of The Perils of Pauline and the other silent film serials in which she starred. In the 1930 detective novel The Maltese Falcon, a small statuette provides both the book's title and its motive for intrigue.

The name MacGuffin was coined by British screenwriter Angus MacPhail. It has been posited that "'guff', as a word for anything trivial or worthless, may lie at the root".

Alfred Hitchcock
Director and producer Alfred Hitchcock popularized the term MacGuffin and the technique with his 1935 film The 39 Steps, in which the MacGuffin is some otherwise incidental military secrets. Hitchcock explained the term MacGuffin in a 1939 lecture at Columbia University in New York City:

It might be a Scottish name, taken from a story about two men on a train. One man says, "What's that package up there in the baggage rack?" And the other answers, "Oh, that's a MacGuffin." The first one asks, "What's a MacGuffin?" "Well," the other man says, "it's an apparatus for trapping lions in the Scottish Highlands." The first man says, "But there are no lions in the Scottish Highlands," and the other one answers, "Well then, that's no MacGuffin!" So you see that a MacGuffin is actually nothing at all.

In a 1966 interview with François Truffaut, Hitchcock explained the term using the same story. He also related this anecdote in a television interview for Richard Schickel's documentary The Men Who Made the Movies, and in an interview with Dick Cavett.

Hitchcock also said, "The MacGuffin is the thing that the spies are after, but the audience doesn't care."

George Lucas
Hitchcock's view of a MacGuffin was an object around which the plot revolves but about which the audience does not care. George Lucas, in contrast, believes that "the audience should care about it almost as much as the dueling heroes and villains on-screen." Lucas describes R2-D2 as the MacGuffin of the original Star Wars film, and said that the Ark of the Covenant, the titular MacGuffin in Raiders of the Lost Ark, was an excellent example as opposed to the more obscure MacGuffin in Indiana Jones and the Temple of Doom and the "feeble" MacGuffin in Indiana Jones and the Last Crusade.

Yves Lavandier
Filmmaker and drama writing theorist Yves Lavandier suggests that a MacGuffin is a secret that motivates the villains. North by Northwests MacGuffin is nothing that motivates the protagonist; Roger Thornhill's objective is to extricate himself from the predicament that the mistaken identity has created, and what matters to Vandamm and the CIA is of little importance to Thornhill. A similar lack of motivating power applies to the MacGuffins of the 1930s films The Lady Vanishes, The 39 Steps, and Foreign Correspondent. In a broader sense, says Lavandier, a MacGuffin denotes any justification for the external conflict in a work.

Examples

Alfred Hitchcock popularized the use of the MacGuffin technique. Examples from Hitchcock's films include plans for a silent plane engine in The 39 Steps (1935), radioactive uranium ore in Notorious (1946), and a clause from a secret peace treaty in Foreign Correspondent (1940).

A more recent MacGuffin is the briefcase in Pulp Fiction (1994), which motivates several of the characters during many of the film's major plot points but whose contents are never revealed. George Lucas also used MacGuffins in the Star Wars saga. He "decided that the Force could be intensified through the possession of a mystical Kiber Crystal [sic]—Lucas's first, but by no means last, great MacGuffin."

In the 1998 film Ronin, the plot revolves around a case, the contents of which remain unknown. At the end of the film, it is said to have led to a historic peace agreement and an end to the Troubles in Northern Ireland.

See also
Alien space bats
Big Dumb Object
The Double McGuffin
Monomyth
Red herring
Schmilblick
Unobtainium

Notes

References

External links

What's a MacGuffin? at Hitchinfo.net
A.Word.A.Day: McGuffin at Wordsmith.org

Fiction
Film and video terminology
Narrative techniques
Narratology
Plot (narrative)